The 2011 Laphroaig Scotch Open was held from December 2 to 4 at the Madison Curling Club in Madison, Wisconsin as part of the 2011–12 World Curling Tour.  The event was held in a triple knockout format.

Men

Teams

Knockout results

A Event

B Event

C Event

Playoffs

Women

Teams

Knockout results

A Event

B Event

C Event

Playoffs

External links

Laphroaig Scotch Open
Laphroaig Scotch Open
Laphroaig Scotch Open